Glenburn may refer to:

Towns in Australia:
 Glenburn, Victoria

Towns in Scotland:
 Glenburn, Paisley

Towns in the United States:
 Glenburn, Maine
 Glenburn, North Dakota
 Glenburn, Pennsylvania

See also
Glen
Burn (stream)